Oorellam Un Paatu is a 1991 Tamil-language film directed by Siraj, starring Ramarajan and Aishwarya. Ilaiyaraja is the music director of the film. The movie was released in the big screens on 1 Jan 1991.

Cast
 Ramarajan
 Nandhini
 Aishwarya
 Senthil
 Goundamani
 Rambo Rajkumar
 Karuppu Subbiah

Soundtrack
All music composed by Ilaiyaraaja. All Lyrics wrote by Vaali and Piraisoodan. 
 Oorellam Un Paatu Thaan - Swarnalatha
 Oorellam Un Paatu Thaan (Male) - K.J. Yesudas
 Noorandu Vazhum Kadhal - Jayachandran
 Thom Thom ena - K.J. Yesudas
 Oorellam Un Paatu Thaan - Ilaiyaraaja

References

1990s Tamil-language films
1991 films
Films scored by Ilaiyaraaja